Puerto Rico Highway 802 (PR-802) is an east–west road between the municipalities of Corozal and Naranjito in Puerto Rico.

Major intersections

See also

 List of highways numbered 802

References

External links
 

802